Mira Hashmi (born 1976) is a Pakistani actress, host and director. She is known for her roles in dramas Teen Bata Teen, Taamak Toyian and Family Front.

Early life
Mira was born in 1976 in Lahore, Pakistan. She completed her studies and did MPhil in Cultural Studies from National College of Arts in Lahore. Later she went to Concordia University in Canada and did Major in film production.

Career
Mira made her debut as an actress in 1995 on PTV. She appeared in a number of dramas on PTV. She appeared in dramas Anteena Washing Powder, Taamak Toyian and Kausar Ka Dastarkhwan. She also appeared in dramas Katauti	and Teen Bata Teen. After that she appeared in comedy drama Family Front as Huma, her role was praised by her co-stars Saba Hameed and Naseem Vicky.

Personal life
Mira is married and has two children. Mira's father Shoaib Hashmi is an actor and her mother is a painter Salima Hashmi and both of her grandparents were Faiz Ahmad Faiz and Alys Faiz poeters. And her aunt Muneeza Hashmi is an producer and her cousin Adeel Hashmi is also an actor.

Filmography

Television

Bibliography
Mira also authored a critically book titled Gulzar's Ijaazat: Insights Into the Film in 2019 in memory of her grandfather Faiz Ahmad Faiz and dedicated to Faiz Festival. The same year she wrote another book titled Three Classic Films by Gulzar: Insights Into the Films co-authored with Saba Mahmood Bashir and Sathya Saran.

References

External links
 
 Mira Hashmi on HarperCollins India
 Meera Hashmi at Cinemaazi

1976 births
Living people
20th-century Pakistani actresses
Pakistani television actresses
21st-century Pakistani actresses